Stearns is a surname derived from the Old English Stierne, which meant severe or strict. Variations include Stearn, Sterne and Stern. Notable people and characters with the name include:

People
Asahel Stearns (1774–1839), U.S. Representative from Massachusetts
Betsey Ann Stearns (1830-1914), American inventor
Bill Stearns (1853–1898), professional baseball pitcher
Carl Leo Stearns (1892–1972), American astronomer
Cassius Clement Stearns (1838–1910), American composer
Charles Woodward Stearns, American writer
Charles Thomas Stearns, American politician
Charlotte Champe Stearns (1843–1929), social worker, poet and mother of T. S. Eliot
Cheryl Stearns, American skydiver
Clark Daniel Stearns (1870–1944), 9th Governor of American Samoa
Cliff Stearns (born 1941), U.S. Representative from Florida
David Stearns, American baseball executive
Eben S. Stearns (1819–1887), American educator
Foster Waterman Stearns (1881–1956), U.S. Representative from New Hampshire
Frank Stearns, close friend of Calvin Coolidge
Frank Preston Stearns (1846–1917), writer and abolitionist from Massachusetts
Frederick Kimball Stearns (1854–1924), businessman (see also Frederick Stearns Building)
George Luther Stearns (1809–1867), American industrialist and merchant
George McLellan Stearns (1901–1979), Canadian Member of Parliament
Glenn Stearns (born 1963), American businessman, founder of Stearns Lending
Guy Beckley Stearns (1870–1947), American physician specializing in homeopathy
Henry A. Stearns (1825–1910), Rhode Island industrialist and Lieutenant Governor
Howard Stearns, football coach for Eastern New Mexico University
Jason Stearns (born 1976), American writer, coordinator of a UN investigation into the wars in the Democratic Republic of the Congo
Jeff Chiba Stearns, Canadian independent animation filmmaker
John Stearns (born 1951), baseball player
John Stearns (physician) (1770–1848), US physician
John Goddard Stearns, Jr. (1843–1917), Boston architect and co-founder of the firm Peabody & Stearns
Junius Brutus Stearns (1810–1885), American painter
Justin K. Stearns (born 1974), American academic
Justus Smith Stearns,  (1845–1933), Michigan businessman
Katee Stearns, beauty queen from Orono, Maine
Marcellus Stearns (1839–1891), the 11th governor of Florida
Marshall Stearns (1908–1966), American jazz critic and musicologist
Martha Stearns Marshall, eighteenth-century Separate Baptist preacher
Michael Stearns (born 1948), American ambient musician
Nellie George Stearns (1855–1936), artist and art teacher
Onslow Stearns, American railroad builder and executive
Ozora P. Stearns (1831–1896), American politician
Peter Stearns, professor of history at George Mason University
R. H. Stearns (1824–1909), tradesman, philanthropist, and politician from Massachusetts
Richard Stearns (disambiguation), several people
Robert Edwards Carter Stearns (1827–1909), American conchologist
Shubal Stearns (1706–1771), American evangelist and preacher
Stephen C. Stearns, Professor of Ecology and Evolutionary Biology at Yale University
Tim Stearns, Professor of Biology at Stanford University
Theodore Stearns (1880–1935), American composer
Thomas Stearns Eliot (1888–1965), British-American poet, essayist, publisher, playwright, literary critic and editor.
Winfrid Alden Stearns (1852–1909), American naturalist

Fictional characters
Mike Stearns, a fictional character in 1632

See also
Sterns (surname)
Stearn, surname

Surnames of Old English origin